Monseigneur Claude Frollo is a fictional character and the main antagonist of Victor Hugo's 1831 novel The Hunchback of Notre-Dame (known in French as Notre-Dame de Paris). He is an Alchemist and Intellectual.

In the novel
Dom Claude Frollo is a pious and highly knowledgeable man who was orphaned along with his younger brother Jehan when their parents died of the plague. His studies led him to become the Archdeacon of Josas, which is his position during the events of the novel. He also has a small fief that provides him with a minor source income, most of which goes to fund his brother's alcoholism.

During a holiday at Notre Dame called Quasimodo Sunday, he rescues a deformed hunchback child whom he finds abandoned on the cathedral's foundlings bed. He adopts the boy, names him "Quasimodo" after the holiday, raises him like a son, and teaches him a sort of sign language when Quasimodo is deafened by the cathedral's bells. Frollo is a respected scholar and studies several languages, law, medicine, science and theology. He becomes infatuated with alchemy, however, which leads townspeople to spread the rumor that he is a sorcerer. He also believes strongly in fate. All this, along with his extreme and irrational fear of women, contribute further to his isolation from society.

Frollo also has strong passions, even though he is a celibate due to his station within the church. These passions erupt in him through his contact with the 16-year-old Roma (Gypsy) girl Esmeralda, and eventually they prove his undoing. He considers her to be a temptation sent by the Devil to test his faith, and curses her as a demon. He finds he cannot resist her, however, and determines to give in to temptation. Esmeralda, however, is repulsed by his advances. Frollo orders Quasimodo to abduct her for him, and then abandons him when the hunchback is suddenly captured by Captain Phoebus de Chateaupers and his guards. Frollo even ignores Quasimodo when he sees him being publicly humiliated for the crime. When Frollo discovers that Esmeralda is in love with Phoebus, he spies on the meeting between them, which Esmeralda has arranged with Phoebus' consent. Phoebus only wants one night of passion.  As Phoebus and Esmeralda are about to make love, Frollo, in a jealous rage, stabs Phoebus, and kisses Esmeralda when she faints before fleeing.

Frollo does not attempt to intercede when Esmeralda is turned over to the magistrate on charges of witchcraft and attempted murder, but he stabs himself during her torture and shows her the wound as a proof of his lust for her. She is unmoved, however. She is also still in love with Phoebus. Shortly before the day she is to be executed, Frollo leaves Paris in a feverish madness, not realizing that Quasimodo – who is also in love with her – has rescued her from the gallows. When he returns to the news that Esmeralda is still alive, he becomes as jealous of Quasimodo as he was of Phoebus. Frollo later attempts to rape her at her sanctuary in the cathedral, but Quasimodo – who doesn't realize who Esmeralda's attacker is at first – comes to the girl's defense and beats Frollo up. Angered and humiliated, Frollo decides to rid himself of Esmeralda by handing her over to the authorities.

Frollo's opportunity to abduct and force Esmeralda comes when a group of scoundrels, enraged by news that the French monarchy has ordered Esmeralda to be taken from the cathedral and hanged within three days, arm themselves to assault Notre Dame Cathedral. While Quasimodo is busy fighting off the scoundrels, Pierre Gringoire, Esmeralda's legal husband – whom she only married to save his life – and a hooded figure sneak into the Cathedral and convince Esmeralda to sneak out with them. The man's face is hidden behind a hood, leaving Esmeralda to guess his identity. They flee to a boat on the River Seine, then separate when they head to shore, with Gringoire taking Esmeralda's goat, Djali, and leaving her with the unknown man. The hooded figure drags Esmeralda to a nearby gallows and identifies himself as Frollo by removing his hood.

Frollo issues Esmeralda his final ultimatum: either she must submit to him, or he will hand her over to the authorities. She rejects him, so he leaves her to an anchoress to hold her for the royal soldiers coming to hang her and goes back to Notre Dame Cathedral. He then walks up to one of the cathedral's towers to watch the girl being hanged, unaware that Quasimodo has spotted him and followed him upstairs. He watches calmly while Esmeralda is taken to the gallows.

When Quasimodo sees him laughing at Esmeralda's hanging, he becomes enraged and pushes Frollo off the balustrade. A gargoyle stops his fall, and he cries out to Quasimodo for help, but Quasimodo remains silent. Then Frollo falls down off the cathedral, colliding with the roof of a house. He slides down the roof, hits the pavement of the town square and dies.

Adaptations
Victor Hugo's novel has been adapted to film on numerous occasions. Due to policies of the NAMPI Thirteen Points, the filmmakers of the 1923 film adaptation would not portray a member of the Roman Catholic Church in a negative and controversial light. As a result, Claude Frollo (played by Nigel de Brulier) is not the villain, but instead a good-hearted archdeacon of Notre Dame, and the villain of the film is actually his younger brother Jehan (played by Brandon Hurst). The 1939 film had a similar change for the same reason due to policies of the Hays Production Code; the only difference is that Jehan (played by Sir Cedric Hardwicke) is portrayed as King Louis XI's Chief Justice of Paris, and Claude (played by Walter Hampden) is portrayed as the Archbishop of Paris. In Disney's 1996 animated film, Claude Frollo (voiced by Tony Jay) is Paris' judge/Minister of Justice and the villain as in the novel, the Archdeacon of Notre Dame is a separate character entirely (and voiced by David Ogden Stiers), and the character of Jehan is omitted.

Among the actors who played Claude Frollo over the years in each adaptation of the novel are:

Jehan actually did appear as he was originally portrayed in the novel in the following adaptations:
The 1956 film (in which he was played by Maurice Sarfati).
The 1977 film (in which he was played by David Rintoul).
The 2014-2015 musical (in which he was played by Lucas Coleman / Jeremy Stolle).

See also

 Esmeralda (The Hunchback of Notre Dame)
 Quasimodo

References

External links
 Illustration Gallery
 Frollo in the Disney Archives-Villains.

Fictional alchemists
Fictional judges
Fictional mass murderers
Fictional priests and priestesses
The Hunchback of Notre-Dame characters
Literary characters introduced in 1831
Male film villains
Male literary villains
Orphan characters in literature
Video game bosses